Anathallis sclerophylla is a species of orchid.

References

External links 

sclerophylla